The Last Best Year is a 1990 American made-for-television drama film starring Mary Tyler Moore and Bernadette Peters concerning a lonely woman who discovers that she has a terminal illness. It originally premiered on ABC on November 4, 1990.

Plot summary
Jane (Bernadette Peters) visits a doctor (Brian Bedford) after becoming ill during a business trip. She is told that she has a terminal illness and is referred to a psychologist, Wendy Haller  (Mary Tyler Moore), to help her in dealing with the emotional aspects of the illness. Jane, although successful at business, leads a solitary life except for occasional times she spends with her married lover, Jerry, who leaves her during her crisis. Reluctant to open herself emotionally at first, she soon warms to Wendy. Jane makes a last trip to visit her beloved Aunt Lizzie (Carmen Mathews).

Jane finally faces the secret she has been hiding for years, that she gave her infant son up for adoption. As she makes peace with guilt from her troubled past and comes to terms with her fate she gains loving support from Aunt Lizzie, Wendy, and Amy and Peter, her co-workers. She returns to the faith she had turned from and makes contact with her grown son. Wendy, also, has had a troubled past and, through her relationship with Jane, resolves her own issues, especially with her mother Anne.

Cast
 Mary Tyler Moore as Wendy Haller
 Bernadette Peters as Jane Murray
 Brian Bedford as Dr. Castle
 Carmen Mathews as Aunt Lizzie
 Kate Reid as Sister Mary Rose
 Kenneth Welsh as Jerry
 Erika Alexander as Amy
 Dorothy McGuire as Anne
 Lawrence Dane as John Dennis
 Michael Hogan as Billy Haller
 Albert Schultz as Peter Hamm
 Bathsheba Garnett as Mrs. Morton
 Michael J. Reynolds as Wisnovsky

Production
The story in The Last Best Year is based on the experiences of the executive producer, Victoria Riskin, wife of the writer David Rintels. Peters previously worked with the director John Erman on her feature film debut, Ace Eli and Rodger of the Skies, and the television movie, David. Erman suggested Peters for the film.

Riskin said of Moore and Peters "Some people may think Mary Tyler Moore and Bernadette Peters...this movie is going to be a laugh a minute. But they're brilliant dramatic actresses."

Responses
John J. O'Connor wrote in his New York Times review: "What takes place is that rare occurrence in films of any sort-a female bonding...Ms. Moore and Ms. Peters give marvelously restrained and touching performances."

References

External links
 

1990 television films
1990 films
1990 drama films
American drama television films
Films directed by John Erman
Films scored by John Morris
ABC Movie of the Week
1990s English-language films
1990s American films